Crawford County (county code CR) is a county located in Southeast Kansas. As of the 2020 census, the county population was 38,972. Its county seat is Girard, and its most populous city is Pittsburg. The county was named in honor of Samuel J. Crawford, Governor of Kansas.

Located in the Osage Cuestas and Cherokee Lowlands, it lies halfway between Kansas City, Missouri and Tulsa, Oklahoma. Crawford County, and much of southeast Kansas, was founded on coal mining, the Pittsburg-Weir Coalfield being located here, and is still known for mining today. Pittsburg State University is located in Crawford County.

History

Early history

For many millennia, the Great Plains of North America was inhabited by nomadic Native Americans.  From the 16th century to 18th century, the Kingdom of France claimed ownership of large parts of North America.  In 1762, after the British defeated France in the French and Indian War, France secretly ceded New France to Spain, per the Treaty of Fontainebleau.

19th century
In 1802, Spain returned most of the former New France land west of the Mississippi to France, but kept title to about 7,500 square miles.  In 1803, the United States acquired much of the West and most of the land for modern-day Kansas as part of the 828,000-square mile Louisiana Purchase, at a cost of 2.83 cents per acre.

In 1854, the Kansas Territory was organized, and in 1861 Kansas was admitted as the 34th U.S. state. The preceding years had been filled with violence as settlers arrived on both sides of the slavery question; the residents voting for Kansas to enter as a free state were the majority. In 1867, Crawford County was established (formed from Bourbon and Cherokee counties). It is named for Samuel J. Crawford, who was the governor in office at the time.

20th century
In the early 20th century, Crawford County was often referred to as the "Little Balkans", because of the many immigrants who came here from that area of Europe. They came to work in the mines, industrial work that did not require much English in the beginning. This area was the site of a number of illegal bootlegging operations, most of which were organized by immigrants in order to supplement their meager earnings as strip miners. During his term, Governor Walter R. Stubbs of Kansas made it his mission to stamp out this practice. According to the criminal justice scholar Ken Peak, "The [Little] Balkans drove [Stubbs] absolutely nuts. He had his hands full and sent people down to the Balkans to clean it up". Despite this crack down, however, the governor was unable to eradicate the crime completely from the area.

21st century
On Sunday, May 4, 2003, a violent F4 tornado touched down in western Crawford County, several miles west of Frontenac at around 4:40 p.m. The towns of Ringo, Franklin, and Mulberry, all in Crawford County, were devastated. The tornado cut a path of destruction roughly one quarter mile wide. Several F4 tornadoes hit Kansas, Missouri, and several other states that day, including the Kansas City metropolitan area. Six deaths were reported in Kansas, and Governor Sebelius declared much of eastern and southeastern Kansas a disaster area, including Crawford County.

Geography

Adjacent counties
 Bourbon County (north)
 Vernon County, Missouri (northeast)
 Barton County, Missouri (east)
 Jasper County, Missouri (southeast)
 Cherokee County (south)
 Labette County (southwest)
 Neosho County (west)

Demographics

The Pittsburg Micropolitan Statistical Area includes all of Crawford County.

As of the census of 2000, there were 38,242 people, 15,504 households, and 9,441 families residing in the county.  The population density was 64 people per square mile (25/km2).  There were 17,221 housing units at an average density of 29 per square mile (11/km2).  The racial makeup of the county was 93.29% White, 1.83% Black or African American, 0.94% Native American, 1.11% Asian, 0.09% Pacific Islander, 1.11% from other races, and 1.63% from two or more races. Hispanic or Latino of any race were 2.38% of the population. 23.5% were of German, 12.5% American, 10.4% English, 10.2% Irish and 8.6% Italian ancestry.

There were 15,504 households, out of which 28.50% had children under the age of 18 living with them, 47.90% were married couples living together, 9.30% had a female householder with no husband present, and 39.10% were non-families. 30.60% of all households were made up of individuals, and 13.40% had someone living alone who was 65 years of age or older.  The average household size was 2.35 and the average family size was 2.96.

In the county, the population was spread out, with 22.90% under the age of 18, 16.40% from 18 to 24, 25.00% from 25 to 44, 20.20% from 45 to 64, and 15.50% who were 65 years of age or older.  The median age was 34 years. For every 100 females there were 95.00 males.  For every 100 females age 18 and over, there were 92.40 males.

The median income for a household in the county was $29,409, and the median income for a family was $40,582. Males had a median income of $27,881 versus $21,517 for females. The per capita income for the county was $16,245.  About 9.40% of families and 16.00% of the population were below the poverty line, including 17.00% of those under age 18 and 10.30% of those age 65 or over.

Government

Presidential elections

Unlike most of the counties in the Ozark-Ouachita “Bible Belt”, Crawford County remained competitive in presidential elections until the 2010s. As recently as 2008 it was carried by Barack Obama, being the only county he ever won between the urban limits of Dallas, Little Rock, Denver and Kansas City. However, like all of the region it has shown a strong anti-Democratic trend in recent years, with Hillary Clinton's 34.91% – though more than she achieved in any rural white southern county – being the worst by a Democrat since 1924. Democrat Laura Kelly did, however, win the county in her successful 2018 gubernatorial bid.

In earlier times, Crawford County was a hotbed of left-wing politics, being the nation's second best county for Eugene Debs in 1912, and one of only four where he gained a plurality of votes. It was also Robert M. La Follette’s second-best Kansas county in 1924, behind only largely Catholic Ellis County.

Only four presidential elections since have seen Crawford County not back the national winner: 1960, 1988, 2012, and 2020.

Laws
Crawford County was a prohibition, or "dry", county until the Kansas Constitution was amended in 1986 and voters approved the sale of alcoholic liquor by the individual drink with a 30% food sales requirement.  The food sales requirement was removed with voter approval in 1992.

The county voted "No" on the 2022 Kansas Value Them Both Amendment, an anti-abortion ballot measure, by 55% to 45% despite backing Donald Trump with 60% of the vote to Joe Biden's 40% in the 2020 presidential election.

Education

Unified school districts
 Northeast USD 246 - Serves the northeast portion of Crawford County, namely Lincoln and Washington Townships, including the towns of Arcadia, Arma, Cockerall, Camp 50, Franklin, Mulberry and Breezy Hill.  Mascot - Vikings  Colors - Burgundy and White
 Southeast USD 247 - Serves primarily portions of Crawford and Cherokee counties, but also includes small portions of Labette and Neosho counties.  The  district serves over 450 students in grades Pre-K through 12.  Southeast High School (the "Lancers") is located just west of the city of Cherokee (the district office is located in the Cherokee/McCune Township).  In Crawford County the district also serves the city of McCune.  Mascot - Lancers  Colors - Columbia Blue and White 
 Girard USD 248 - Serves Girard and the Girard Township, including the towns of Farlington, Walnut, Greenbush and Hepler.  Mascot - Trojans  Colors - Maroon and Yellow/Gold
 Frontenac USD 249 - Serves Frontenac and the Frontenac Township, including the towns of Yale, Radley, Ringo and Mindenmines, Missouri.  Mascot - Raiders  Colors - Black and White/Silver
 Pittsburg USD 250 - Serves Pittsburg and the Pittsburg Township, including the towns of Chicopee, Opolis, and Asbury, Missouri.  Mascot - Purple Dragons  Colors - Purple and White

Private schools
 Saint Mary's - Colgan (Web site) is a private Catholic K-12 school located in Pittsburg.  Mascot - Panthers  Colors - Blue and White

Higher education
 Pittsburg State University is located in Pittsburg.

Libraries
 Pittsburg Public Library
 Girard Public Library

Communities

Cities

 Arcadia
 Arma
 Cherokee
 Frontenac
 Girard
 Hepler
 McCune
 Mulberry
 Pittsburg
 Walnut

Unincorporated places
†This populated place is designated a Census-Designated Place (CDP) by the United States Census Bureau.

 Beulah
 Brazilton
 Camp 50
 Capaldo
 Cato
 Chicopee†
 Coalvale
 Cornell
 Croweburg†
 Curranville
 Dry Wood
 Dunkirk
 Englevale
 Farlington†
 Fleming
 Foxtown
 Franklin†
 Fuller
 Greenbush
 Gross
 Kirkwood
 Klondike
 Kniveton‡
 Litchfield
 Lone Oak
 Midway
 Monmouth
 Opolis†
 Radley†
 Red Onion
 Ringo†
 South Radley
 Yale†

Townships
Crawford County is divided into nine townships.  The cities of Frontenac, Girard, Mulberry, and Pittsburg are considered governmentally independent and are excluded from the census figures for the townships.  In the following table, the population center is the largest city (or cities) included in that township's population total, if it is of a significant size.

See also
 National Register of Historic Places listings in Crawford County, Kansas

References

Notes

Further reading

 A Twentieth century history and biographical record of Crawford County, Kansas; Home Authors; Lewis Publishing Co; 656 pages; 1905.
 Plat Book of Crawford County, Kansas; North West Publishing Co; 54 pages; 1906.

External links

County
 
 Crawford County - Directory of Public Officials
 Crawford County - Convention and Visitors Bureau
Historical
 Crawford Co. Kansas History and Heritage - Genealogy
Maps
 Crawford County Maps: Current, Historic, KDOT
 Kansas Highway Maps: Current, Historic, KDOT
 Kansas Railroad Maps: Current, 1996, 1915, KDOT and Kansas Historical Society

 
1867 establishments in Kansas
Kansas counties
Populated places established in 1867